Conura is a genus of chalcidid wasps in the family Chalcididae, containing more than 300 species described. They are distributed mostly in the New World, especially in the Neotropical region, where 279 species occur. Conura is divided into three subgenera and 63 species groups, which may not form taxonomic entities but reflect patterns of morphology that are useful for focused studies.

Species

Subgenus Ceratosmicra
 Conura cocois (Wolcott, 1924)
 Conura cameroni (Ashmead, 1904)
 Conura fusiformis (Ashmead, 1904)
 Conura mayri (Ashmead, 1904)
 Conura tripunctata (Ashmead, 1904)
 Conura baturitei Tavares, 2019
 Conura convergea Delvare, 2003
 Conura dentiscapa Moitoza, 1994
 Conura delicata (Cresson, 1872)
 Conura bruchi (Blanchard, 1943)
 Conura elachis (Burks, 1940)
 Conura fulvovariegata (Cameron, 1884)
 Conura hirtifemora (Ashmead, 1885)
 Conura marcosensis (Cameron, 1904)
 Conura misturata (Howard, 1894)
 Conura perplexa (Ashmead, 1904)
 Conura petioliventris (Cameron, 1894)
 Conura pseudofulvovariegata (Becker, 1989)
 Conura ruffinellii (Blanchard, 1947)
 Conura unimaculata (Ashmead, 1904)
 Conura camescens Delvare, 1992
 Conura immaculata (Cresson, 1865)
 Conura lissa (Burks, 1940)
 Conura meteori (Burks, 1940)
 Conura onorei Delvare, 1992
 Conura albifrons (Walsh, 1861)
 Conura delumbis (Cresson, 1872)
 Conura dema (Burks, 1940)
 Conura dorsimaculata (Cameron, 1884)
 Conura flavopicta (Cresson, 1865)
 Conura leptis (Burks, 1940)
 Conura mendica (Cresson, 1872)
 Conura nigrita (Howard, 1894)
 Conura porteri (Brèthes, 1923)
 Conura sanguiniventris (Cresson, 1872)
 Conura side (Walker, 1843)
 Conura torvina (Cresson, 1872)
 Conura tanais (Burks, 1940)
Subgenus Conura
 Conura bouceki Delvare, 1992
 Conura dares (Walker, 1842)
 Conura incongrua (Ashmead, 1904)
 Conura acragae Delvare, 1993
 Conura ardens (Cameron, 1897)
 Conura bergi (Kirby, 1885)
 Conura celsa (Walker, 1864)
 Conura chapadae (Ashmead, 1904)
 Conura chapadensis (Ashmead, 1904)
 Conura corumbensis (Ashmead, 1904)
 Conura enocki (Ashmead, 1904)
 Conura fasciola (Cameron, 1897)
 Conura flammeola (Cresson, 1872)
 Conura flavicans Spinola, 1837
 Conura howardi (Ashmead, 1904)
 Conura igneoides (Kirby, 1883)
 Conura igneopatruelis Moitoza, 1994
 Conura leptogastra (Cameron, 1909)
 Conura lineocoxalis (Ashmead, 1904)
 Conura luteipennis (Walker, 1862)
 Conura maculata (Fabricius, 1787)
 Conura magistrettii (Blanchard, 1941)
 Conura maria (Riley, 1870)
 Conura mendozaensis (Cameron, 1909)
 Conura miniata (Cameron, 1884)
 Conura nigrifrons (Cameron, 1884)
 Conura patagonica (Blanchard, 1935)
 Conura phais (Burks, 1940)
 Conura pilosipartis Moitoza, 1994
 Conura rodriguezi (Cockerell, 1912)
 Conura segoviae (Cameron, 1904)
 Conura sordida (Walker, 1862)
 Conura strigosa (Costa, 1864)
 Conura vagabunda (Ashmead, 1904)
 Conura azteca (Cresson, 1872)
 Conura coccinea (Cresson, 1865)
 Conura conjungens (Walker, 1871)
 Conura coxalis (Cresson, 1872)
 Conura flavoaxillaris (Ashmead, 1904)
 Conura koehleri (Blanchard, 1935)
 Conura lasnierii (Guérin-Méneville, 1844)
 Conura martinezi Delvare, 1993
 Conura montezuma (Cresson, 1872)
 Conura napo Delvare, 1993
 Conura nigricornis (Fabricius, 1798)
 Conura nortonii (Cresson, 1872)
 Conura phobetronae Delvare, 1993
 Conura pompiloides (Walker, 1871)
 Conura rufa (Gahan, 1934)
 Conura sibinecola (Blanchard, 1935)
 Conura silvestrii (de Santis, 1980)
 Conura basilica (Walker, 1864)
 Conura elaeisis Delvare, 1993
 Conura fortidens (Cameron, 1909)
 Conura giraulti (de Santis, 1979)
 Conura mexicana (Cresson, 1872)
 Conura oiketicusi (Cameron, 1913)
 Conura philippia Delvare, 1992
 Conura steffani Delvare, 1992
 Conura toluca (Cresson, 1872)
 Conura vau (Ashmead, 1904)
Subgenus Spilochalcis
 Conura blanda (Walker, 1864)
 Conura flavoorbitalis (Ashmead, 1904)
 Conura magdalenensis Delvare, 1993
 Conura marginata (Ashmead, 1904)
 Conura tolteca (Cresson, 1872)
 Conura napoca Delvare, 1992
 Conura picta (Fabricius, 1804)
 Conura scutellaris (Cresson, 1865)
 Conura tygen Delvare, 1992
 Conura chrysomera (Walker, 1862)
 Conura scissa (Walker, 1864)
 Conura coccinata (Cresson, 1872)
 Conura dimidiata (Fabricius, 1804)
 Conura annexa (Walker, 1864)
 Conura exinaniens (Walker, 1864)
 Conura pylas (Walker, 1842)
 Conura huberi Delvare, 1992
 Conura leucotela (Walker, 1862)
 Conura referator (Walker, 1862)
 Conura sichelata Delvare, 1992
 Conura similis (Ashmead, 1904)
 Conura surumuae Delvare, 1992
 Conura transidiata Delvare, 1992
 Conura accila (Walker, 1841)
 Conura decisa (Walker, 1862)
 Conura destinata (Walker, 1864)
 Conura dorsata (Cresson, 1872)
 Conura eubule (Cresson, 1865)
 Conura foveata (Kirby, 1883)
 Conura phoenica (Burks, 1940)
 Conura transitiva (Walker, 1862)
 Conura vesicula Delvare, 1992
 Conura acutigaster Delvare, 1992
 Conura aequalis (Walker, 1864)
 Conura demota (Walker, 1864)
 Conura trilineata (Ashmead, 1904)
 Conura apaiis (Burks, 1940)
 Conura desmieri Delvare, 1993
 Conura hispinephaga Delvare, 1993
 Conura arcuaspina Delvare, 1992
 Conura biannulata (Ashmead, 1904)
 Conura minuta Delvare, 1992
 Conura carinata Delvare, 1992
 Conura carinifera Delvare, 1992
 Conura contributa (Walker, 1864)
 Conura cressoni (Howard, 1897)
 Conura debilis (Say, 1836)
 Conura longipetiola (Ashmead, 1885)
 Conura quadrilineata (Cameron, 1913)
 Conura prodebilis Delvare, 1992
 Conura adjuncta (Walker, 1864)
 Conura albomaculata (Ashmead, 1904)
 Conura annulifera (Walker, 1864)
 Conura bipunctata (Ashmead, 1904)
 Conura discolor (Walker, 1862)
 Conura ghilianii (Spinola, 1851)
 Conura lauta (Cresson, 1872)
 Conura lenta (Cresson, 1872)
 Conura lobata (Costa, 1864)
 Conura santaremensis (Ashmead, 1904)
 Conura tarsalis (Ashmead, 1904)
 Conura santarema (Ashmead, 1904)
 Conura testaceicollis (Cameron, 1913)
 Conura tuberculata (Ashmead, 1904)
 Conura elongata Delvare, 1992
 Conura janzeni Delvare, 1992
 Conura adela (Burks, 1939)
 Conura alutacea Delvare, 1992
 Conura lenkoi (de Santis, 1980)
 Conura maculipennis (Cameron, 1884)
 Conura media (Ashmead, 1904)
 Conura timida (Ashmead, 1904)
 Conura asantaremensis (Girault, 1913)
 Conura melana (Burks, 1940)
 Conura flaviscutellum (Girault, 1913)
 Conura nigropetiolata (Ashmead, 1904)
 Conura odontotae (Howard, 1885)
 Conura paya (Burks, 1940)
 Conura planifrons Delvare, 1992
 Conura propodea Delvare, 1992
 Conura rasplusi Delvare, 1992
 Conura megalospila (Cameron, 1913)
 Conura rufodorsalis (Ashmead, 1904)
 Conura shemaida Delvare, 1992
 Conura hansoni Delvare, 1992
 Conura iota Delvare, 1992
 Conura rufoscutellaris (Ashmead, 1904)
 Conura townesi Delvare, 1992
 Conura tricolorata (Cameron, 1913)
 Conura arcana (Cresson, 1872)
 Conura brancensis (Ashmead, 1904)
 Conura capitulata (Costa, 1864)
 Conura coronata (Cameron, 1913)
 Conura juxta (Cresson, 1872)
 Conura laddi (Girault, 1913)
 Conura nigropleuralis (Ashmead, 1904)
 Conura pulchripes (Cameron, 1909)
 Conura tridentata Delvare, 1992
 Conura abdominalis (Walker, 1862)
 Conura andersoni (Waterston, 1916)
 Conura congolensis (Schmitz, 1946)
 Conura lecta (Cresson, 1872)
 Conura libanotica (Schmiedeknecht, 1909)
 Conura nigrorufa (Walker, 1852)
 Conura provancheri (Burks, 1968)
 Conura subobsoleta (Cresson, 1872)
 Conura tenebrosa (Walker, 1862)
 Conura xantha (Burks, 1940)
 Conura xanthostigma (Dalman, 1820)
 Conura alienata (Walker, 1864)
 Conura annulipes (Spinola, 1853)
 Conura appressa (Walker, 1864)
 Conura atrata (Ashmead, 1904)
 Conura certa (Walker, 1864)
 Conura compactilis (Cresson, 1872)
 Conura decipiens (Kirby, 1883)
 Conura discalis (Walker, 1862)
 Conura incerta (Kirby, 1883)
 Conura transversa (Walker, 1862)
 Conura brasiliensis (Ashmead, 1904)
 Conura composita (Walker, 1864)
 Conura convexa Delvare, 1992
 Conura scalpella Delvare, 1992
 Conura sexdentata (Cameron, 1884)
 Conura acuta (Fabricius, 1804)
 Conura correcta (Walker, 1864)
 Conura imitator (Walker, 1862)
 Conura axillaris (Ashmead, 1904)
 Conura bidentata (Ashmead, 1904)
 Conura distincta Delvare, 1992
 Conura emarginata (Fabricius, 1804)
 Conura apicalis (Ashmead, 1904)
 Conura attacta (Walker, 1864)
 Conura belti (Cameron, 1904)
 Conura congrua (Walker, 1862)
 Conura expleta (Walker, 1864)
 Conura femorata (Fabricius, 1775)
 Conura ferruginea (Fabricius, 1804)
 Conura meridionalis (Ashmead, 1904)
 Conura pintoi (de Santis, 1980)
 Conura sexmaculata (Ashmead, 1904)
 Conura unilineata (Ashmead, 1904)
 Conura mesomelas (Walker, 1862)
 Conura depicta (Walker, 1864)
 Conura hempeli (Ashmead, 1904)
 Conura quadripunctata (Fabricius, 1804)
 Conura initia Delvare, 1997
 Conura amoena (Say, 1836)
 Conura adsita (Walker, 1864)
 Conura aemula (Walker, 1864)
 Conura commoda (Walker, 1864)
 Conura costalis (Walker, 1862)
 Conura acuminata (Ashmead, 1904)
 Conura admixta (Walker, 1864)
 Conura contermina (Walker, 1864)
 Conura flava (Fabricius, 1804)
 Conura longicaudata (Ashmead, 1904)
 Conura variegata (Fabricius, 1804)
 Conura lutea Delvare, 1992
 Conura bennetti (de Santis, 1979)
 Conura costalimai (de Santis, 1980)
 Conura mourei (de Santis, 1980)
 Conura persimilis (Ashmead, 1904)
 Conura grisselli Delvare, 1992
 Conura hollandi (Ashmead, 1904)
 Conura ashmiata Delvare, 1992
 Conura ashmilis Delvare, 1992
 Conura burmeisteri (Kirby, 1883)
 Conura fischeri (Brèthes, 1927)
 Conura morleyi (Ashmead, 1904)
 Conura nebulosa (Walker, 1862)
 Conura pallens (Cresson, 1865)
 Conura pygmaea (Fabricius, 1804)
 Conura terminalis (Walker, 1864)
No subgenus
 Conura africanus (Schmitz, 1946)
 Conura ampyx (Walker, 1850)
 Conura anisitsi (Girault, 1911)
 Conura attalica (Walker, 1864)
 Conura bertonii (Brèthes, 1909)
 Conura brassolis (Schrottky, 1909)
 Conura capensis (Cameron, 1907)
 Conura carinifoveata (Cameron, 1909)
 Conura contacta (Walker, 1864)
 Conura efficta (Walker, 1864)
 Conura equadorica Özdikmen, 2011
 Conura fidius (Walker, 1850)
 Conura flavescens (André, 1881)
 Conura illata (Walker, 1862)
 Conura intermedia (Cresson, 1865)
 Conura laticeps (Ashmead, 1904)
 Conura leprieuri (Spinola, 1840)
 Conura noyesi Özdikmen, 2011
 Conura pallida (Holmgren, 1868)
 Conura paranensis (Schrottky, 1902)
 Conura pratinas (Walker, 1850)
 Conura saintpierrei (Girault, 1913)
 Conura scudderi (Brues, 1910)
 Conura spilosoma (Cameron, 1904)
 Conura torrida (Walker, 1852)
 Conura trichostibatis (Strand, 1911)
 Conura variicolor (Dalla Torre, 1898)
 Conura vigintidentata (Brèthes, 1922)

References

External links

 

Parasitic wasps
Articles created by Qbugbot
Chalcidoidea